Glyphipterix alpha is a species of sedge moth in the genus Glyphipterix. It was described by Sigeru Moriuti and Tosihisa Saito in 1964. It is found in Honshu, Japan.

The wingspan is 9–10 mm.

References

Moths described in 1964
Glyphipterigidae
Moths of Japan